Ark 21 Records was a record label established by Miles & Stewart Copeland in 1997, based in Sherman Oaks, Los Angeles, California, United States.

Artists
Kathem Al-Saher
Ragheb Alamah
Aswad
The Badlees
The Beautiful South
John Berry
Belinda Carlisle
Paul Carrack
Concrete Blonde
Delinquent Habits
Farrah
Faudel
Hakim
Wayne Hancock
Darren Holden
The Human League
Waylon Jennings
Eric Johnson
Khaled
Liquid Soul
Pat MacDonald
Cheb Mami
Manu Chao
Mohamed Mounir
Alannah Myles
Neon Steam Dreams
Ocean Colour Scene
Pentaphobe
Porcupine Tree
Emma Shapplin
Maia Sharp
Steve Stevens
Strontium 90
Rachid Taha
Therapy?
Simon Townshend (Pete Townshend's younger brother)
Transglobal Underground

See also
 List of record labels

References

Defunct record labels of the United States
Pop record labels